Tyson House may refer to:

in the United States
(sorted by state)
McBryde-Screws-Tyson House, Montgomery, Alabama, listed on the National Register of Historic Places (NRHP) in Montgomery County
Tyson-Maner House, Montgomery, Alabama, listed on the NRHP in Montgomery County
Tyson House (Reno, Nevada), listed on the NRHP in Washoe County
Gen. Lawrence D. Tyson House, Knoxville, Tennessee, listed on the NRHP in Knox County